The Murchison Highway is a highway located in the West Coast region of Tasmania, Australia. The  highway runs generally north–south, with Somerset, near Burnie, as its northern terminus and Zeehan as its southern terminus. The highway was opened on 13 December 1963.

Course
The highway is susceptible to ice and snow in winter. One of the notorious sections is at the edge of Mount Black; numerous accidents have occurred in the area. Also the Zeehan to Rosebery section has hazardous sections which can be affected by cold and wet weather.

Portions of the highway have been made redundant by extra roads built by Hydro Tasmania during their work on the upper Pieman River scheme and the Henty River dam schemes. These provide short cuts from Queenstown straight through to Tullah by going just west of the West Coast Range.

The highway crosses the Mackintosh River and the Murchison River near the town of Tullah, where the rivers form a confluence to form the Pieman River.

History
Prior to the construction of the highway, the west coast of Tasmania could only be accessed by the Emu Bay Railway, or by ship to Regatta Point or Strahan in Macquarie Harbour.

See also

 Highways in Australia
 List of highways in Tasmania

References

External links
 Road Condition overview

Highways in Tasmania
Pieman River Power Development
Roads in Western Tasmania